Ma Bassmahlak ("I Don't Allow You") is the fifth album by Najwa Karam and her second release on the Rotana label.

Track listing 

1995 albums
Najwa Karam albums
Rotana Records albums